Loïc Korval (born 15 May 1988 in Nogent-sur-Marne, France) is a French judoka who won a bronze medal at the 2010 World Judo Championships and a silver medal at the 2010 European Judo Championships. He also won gold in European Judo Championships in 2014, Montpellier at -66, defeating his fellow countryman David Larose in the final

References

External links

 

French male judoka
Sportspeople from Nogent-sur-Marne
1988 births
Living people
French people of Guadeloupean descent
Judoka at the 2015 European Games
European Games medalists in judo
European Games gold medalists for France
European Games silver medalists for France
21st-century French people